Solo for Sparrow is a 1962 crime film directed by Gordon Flemyng and produced by Jack Greenwood and Abhinandan Nikhanj, part of the Edgar Wallace Mysteries series of British second-features. It stars Glyn Houston, Anthony Newlands and Nadja Regin, and features Michael Caine in an early supporting role. The film was released in America in 1966, when the producers capitalised on Caine's new-found fame and released it with his name above the title.

Plot
Inspector Sparrow (Glyn Houston) is a provincial detective who sets up his own private-eye firm when Scotland Yard meddles with his business. When crooks accidentally kill a shop cashier while stealing the keys to the jewellery shop where she works, Sparrow goes to work. He successfully tracks down the criminals and turns them over to Scotland Yard.

Cast
 Glyn Houston as Inspector Sparrow
 Anthony Newlands as Reynolds
 Nadja Regin as Mrs. Reynolds
 Michael Coles as Pin Norman
 Allan Cuthbertson as Chief Superintendent Symington
 Ken Wayne as Baker
 Jerry Stovin as Lewis
 Jack May as Inspector Hudson
 Murray Melvin as Larkin
 Peter Thomas as Bell
 Michael Caine as Mooney
 Neil McCarthy as Dusty
 Susan Maryott as Sue Warren
 William Gaunt as Detective Sergeant Reeve
 Nancy O'Neil as Miss Martin
 Yvonne Buckingham as Jenny
 Bartlett Mullins as Mr. Walters
 Wanda Ventham as Waitress
 Eric Dodson as Dr. Wolfson

References

External links
 

1962 films
Edgar Wallace Mysteries
1962 crime drama films
British crime drama films
British black-and-white films
Films directed by Gordon Flemyng
1960s English-language films
1960s British films